John William McDaniel (born February 26, 1961, St. Louis, Missouri, United States) is an American theatre producer, composer, conductor, and pianist. He is known as the lead composer and producer of the daytime television talk show The Rosie O'Donnell Show, for which he received six Daytime Emmy Award nominations, winning two.

McDaniel is also known for his collaborations with Patti LuPone, most notably her 1995 concert Patti LuPone: Live!, which debuted on Broadway after a Los Angeles engagement. He won a Grammy Award for producing the cast album of Annie Get Your Gun (1999).

Biography 
McDaniel was born John William McDaniel on February 26, 1961, in St. Louis, Missouri. He first studied piano with his mother Jane, and graduated from Kirkwood High School (St. Louis), then earned a BFA degree in Drama from Carnegie Mellon University.

Career

1990s 
McDaniel conducted a Los Angeles production of Chicago: The Musical in 1992, for which he earned a Los Angeles Drama Critics Circle Award. In 1993, McDaniel conducted the orchestra for a concert presentation of Stephen Sondheim's Company. The event, which reunited the entire original Broadway cast, took place on April 11, 1993, at Lincoln Center Theater's Vivian Beaumont Theater. Prior to this, the production ran at the Terrace Theatre in Long Beach, California, in January 1993.

He was offered the job of musical director and conductor for the successful revival of Grease: The Musical, which opened at the Eugene O'Neill Theatre on March 11, 1994. This revival concluded its three-year run on January 25, 1998. With Patti LuPone, he co-created the concert Patti LuPone: Live!, which ran in Los Angeles in April/May 1993, and played on Broadway as Patti LuPone on Broadway from October to November 1995.  He worked as music director on the Sherman Brothers musical Busker Alley starring Tommy Tune from 1994 to 1995.

In 1996, McDaniel became producer and composer on Rosie O'Donnell's talk show, The Rosie O'Donnell Show. The series ran until May 22, 2002, garnering McDaniel two Daytime Emmy Awards out of six nominations. On the 1996 television series The Nanny, the talk show was featured in the episode "The Rosie Show." McDaniel appears in scenes of The Rosie O'Donnell Show used in the episode.  McDaniel and the rest of the house band were dubbed "The McDLT's."

On March 4, 1999, a revival of Irving Berlin's Annie Get Your Gun opened at the Marquis Theatre, with McDaniel as vocal arranger and supervising musical director, which ran until September 2001.

2000s 
In 2000, McDaniel received a Board of Directors' Award from the Manhattan Association of Cabarets & Clubs. Subsequent Broadway credits include Taboo in 2003 and Brooklyn in 2004. McDaniel later served as musical director and orchestrator for the Frank Wildhorn, Don Black and Ivan Menchell musical adaptation of Bonnie & Clyde, in a Roundabout Theatre Company reading in February 2009.

2010s 
McDaniel collaborated with Tyne Daly for a "much-raved-about gig at Feinstein's at Loews Regency" in January 2010; he subsequently worked with Daly and Jerry Mitchell on a workshop of the dance show, Queen of the Stardust Ballroom. In November 2010, McDaniel worked with Brooke Shields on her American Songbook Project live auction item, An Evening with Brooke Shields and John McDaniel, which consisted of "a private cabaret performance that will take place in an apartment overlooking Lincoln Center for up to 30 friends of the highest bidder."

McDaniel served as the musical director and conductor of the on-stage orchestra for the 2011 Broadway musical Catch Me If You Can, which is composed by Marc Shaiman with lyrics by Shaiman and Scott Wittman. The musical opened at the Neil Simon Theatre on April 10, 2011.

McDaniel is also composing the work-in-progress musical It's a Wonderful Life. This is an adaptation of the 1946 film of the same name, which deals with George Bailey, a man whose imminent suicide on Christmas Eve brings about the intervention of his guardian angel, Clarence Odbody. Clarence shows George all the lives he has touched and the contributions he has made to his community. Said McDaniel in an interview:

Discography

Solo albums

Cast albums

Compilation albums

Awards and nominations 
Wins
1992 Los Angeles Drama Critics Circle Award, Best Musical Direction, Chicago
1999 Grammy Award, Best Musical Show Album, Annie Get Your Gun
2001 Daytime Emmy Award, Outstanding Talk Show, The Rosie O'Donnell Show
2002 Daytime Emmy Award, Outstanding Talk Show, The Rosie O'Donnell Show

Nominations
1998 Daytime Emmy Award, Outstanding Achievement in Music Direction and Composition, The Rosie O'Donnell Show
2001 Daytime Emmy Award, Outstanding Achievement in Music Direction and Composition, The Rosie O'Donnell Show
2002 Daytime Emmy Award, Outstanding Achievement in Music Direction and Composition, The Rosie O'Donnell Show

Personal life 
McDaniel, who is openly gay, currently resides in New York City with his dog: Beauregard.

References

External links
Official website

1961 births
Grammy Award winners
American male conductors (music)
Music directors
Cabaret composers
Carnegie Mellon University College of Fine Arts alumni
Living people
American LGBT musicians
LGBT people from Missouri
21st-century American conductors (music)
21st-century male musicians